The Bresser Corporation is a Germany-based manufacturer of binoculars, telescopes and microscopes.

History
Bresser GmbH was founded by Josef Bresser in 1957. The company began by specializing in the import and distribution of binoculars. Rolf Bresser sold his father's business in 1999 to the American company Meade Instruments in Irvine, California, the company operating under Meade Instruments Europe GmbH until 2009, when it was acquired by former owner Rolf Bresser, its general manager, Helmut Ebbert, and Chinese manufacturer Jinghua Optical Electronics Co., Ltd. (JOC).

In 2005 the Bresser Messier Line of fine telescopes for the intermediate astronomy enthusiast was launched. In the US the distribution firm Bresser LLC was founded in 2010.

References

External links
 

Telescope manufacturers
Optics manufacturing companies
Technology companies of Germany
Companies based in North Rhine-Westphalia
Technology companies established in 1957